Acrocat Software, was an American corporation that was founded in 2001. Acrocat Software produced two Palm OS applications. PDAbs is licensed and distributed by Handmark, a developer and distributor of mobile content.

 PDAbs
 People's Choice Award Winner
 Champion Award Winner for Best Fitness Application. Selected by members of the media and over 20 industry experts.
 AcroWiki
 The first Twiki-based Palm OS application

References

General references
 Handango Announces People's Choice Award Winners
 Handango Press Release

External links
 Official site
 Handmark site

Software companies based in California
Companies based in San Luis Obispo County, California
Software companies established in 2001
2001 establishments in California
Defunct software companies of the United States
Companies established in 2001
2001 establishments in the United States